The Auzeinae are a subfamily of the lepidopteran family Uraniidae.

References

External links

Auzeinae at Markku Savela's Lepidoptera and Some Other Life Forms
Moths of Northeast India

Uraniidae